Lillie is both a surname and a given name. Notable people with the name include:

Surname 
 Arthur Lillie (1831–1911), British soldier, Buddhist and author
 Axel Lillie (1603–1662), Swedish soldier and politician
 Beatrice Lillie (1894–1989), Canadian-born comic actress
 Denis G. Lillie  (1884–1963), British biologist and Antarctic explorer
 Dennis Lillie (born 1945), Australian cricketer
 Ella Fillmore Lillie (1884–1972), American artist
 Frank Rattray Lillie (1870–1947), American zoologist
 Harold Lilie, American bridge player
 Jacqueline Lillie (born 1941). French artist and jeweller working in glass
 Jim Lillie (1861–1890), American baseball player
 John Lillie (minister) (1806–1866), Presbyterian minister in Australia
 John Lillie (politician) (1847–1921), American representative from Washington State
 John Scott Lillie (1790–1868), British Army officer
 Joseph Christian Lillie (1760–1827), Danish architect
 May Lillie (1869–1936), American Wild West entertainer
 Mildred Lillie (1915–2002), American judge

Given name 
Lillie Berg (1845–1896), American musician, musical educator
Lillie P. Bliss (1864–1931), American art collector and historian
Lillie Burke (died 1949), American educator
Lillie Hayward (1891–1977), American actress
Lillie Langtry, 18th-19th century British actress
Lillie Leatherwood (born 1964), American sprinter
Lillie McCloud (born 1958), American singer
 Lillie, a nickname of suspected terrorist Mohammed Nazir Bin Lep

Fictional characters 
Lillie, a character from the video game Pokémon Sun and Moon
Lillie: A Lightship from the children's television series TUGS.

See also
Lily (name)
Lilly (given name)
Lili (given name) 

English feminine given names